"Rock n Roll Jesus" is the fifth single from Kid Rock's album of the same name. It is a bravado-laced Kid Rock song about sex, drugs and rock 'n' roll. The song was co-written by former lead guitarist Kenny Tudrick, who replaced Kenny Olson on the 2006 'Live' Trucker tour. The song and album title were attacked by some religious groups for being sacrilegious.

The song along with "All Summer Long" and "Son of Detroit" were featured in the guitar game Power Gig: Rise of the SixString. A live version was released on the Target version of Born Free in 2010.

Charts

References

2007 songs
2008 singles
Kid Rock songs
Songs written by Kid Rock
Song recordings produced by Rob Cavallo
Atlantic Records singles